Playware Studios Pte Ltd is a Singapore-based technology company specialising in games for learning. The company creates software and hardware products in the B2B emerging education technology space. The company organizes the Academy of Play, and trains Adult Educators, Teachers and HR professionals on the use of AR/VR, Serious Games and Simulations for Training and Education.

History 

Playware Studios Pte Ltd was founded in 2005. The company started as a serious games company creating games for the Ministry of Education in Singapore and has focused on using information communication technology to deliver education to students. From 2005 to 2008, the company developed over 50 serious games titles.

Since 2008, Playware has moved towards the education technology space, focusing on game based learning products.

The company introduced the concept of "Hiving", an emergent game play and user-generated media that can be used by teachers and students through the 3DHive platform to bring engaged learning into the classroom. Since Hiving was introduced through the FutureSchools@Singapore programme, the opportunity for the development of infocomm-enabled pedagogies has been possible. Schools are also able to re-design curriculum and assessment tools by incorporating them into the platform; changing their effective administration practices. Canberra Primary School was the first school to incorporate CanberraLIVE, an integrated virtual learning environment incorporating immersive virtual reality gaming, multi-modal digital media and mobile learning application.

For schools in Singapore, 3DHive is SSOE compliant and can be installed on all Ministry of Education devices. It is also part of an approved list of software for Singapore schools to be used in their Infocomm Clubs programme sponsored by the Infocomm Development Authority. Playware Studios was a finalist in Microsoft’s 2013 Partner of the Year awards under the category for Public Sector Partner of the Year – Education.

In December 2014 Playware Studios’ 3DHive was selected as the Singapore winner of the first Bett Asia & IDA EdTech Excellence Award. Playware Studios was one of 10 companies – five from Singapore and five international – which were shortlisted to pitch at the Bett Asia & IDA EdTech Excellence Award jointly organised by Bett Asia and the Infocomm Development Authority of Singapore (IDA).

Under the Innovative Learning 2020 (iN.Learn 2020), launched by the Singapore Workforce Development Agency (WDA), Jurong Health, partnered with Playware to train their nurses using virtual reality games. Nurses can use these games to practise the steps to resuscitate a patient or learn about post-operation care. Ms Prema Balan, senior assistant director in nursing education at Jurong Health Services, said the virtual reality game it uses has helped to alleviate constraints in booking training facilities. "With this, you can just use it anywhere," she said. Playware Studios was one of the multiple award winners  for Brandan Hall group's Excellence in Technology awards 2015.

Products

3DHive 

Launched at the end of 2012, 3DHive was originally built for the FutureSchools@Singapore project in a 4-year collaboration with the Ministry Of Education, National Research Foundation and Infocomm Development Authority of Singapore. Playware Studios collaborated with the team at Canberra Primary School to create 3DHive, an integrated, holistic, pervasive games for learning platform built from the ground up for use in the classroom.[8] Integrated into Microsoft’s Azure platform, the software is for Windows, Linux, Mac OS and Kinect-for-Windows.”

3DHive is used as an educational games platform to classrooms and more than 500 teachers from 100 K-12 schools and institutions of higher learning in Singapore have been trained to use the platform and students, ranging from primary to secondary school, have learnt and built their own games. The platform is now being used by schools for game-based and scenario-based learning, integrated project work and for co-curricular activities. It has been used for diverse subjects such as Mathematics, History, Chinese and Character Education.

Through the platform’s point-and-click game editor software, educators and students are able to input User-Generated-Content; allowing users to learn whilst playing a serious game. It is cloud-hosted without any setup or overhead costs and has built-in tools for collaboration, classroom management and assessment.

In 2012, the Supreme Court of Singapore used 3DHive to build ‘The Learning Court’, a game to showcase a virtual version of the Supreme Court.

The Workforce Development Agency of Singapore also used it to create a role-play game called ‘Explore CI WSQ Virtual World’ for an exhibition on creative industries. 
3DHive was originally built for the FutureSchools@Singapore project in a 4-year collaboration with Ministry Of Education, National Research Foundation and Infocomm Development Authority of Singapore. Playware Studios collaborated with the team at Canberra Primary School to create 3DHive, an integrated, holistic, pervasive games for learning platform built from the ground up for use in the classroom.

In 2014, The 'Every Door is Right Door' Simulation Training Programme, built on 3DHive and developed for the Civil Service College, Singapore won the Brandon Hall Group Excellence in Learning Awards (Bronze) for the Best Use of Games and Simulations for Learning.

In 2015 3DHive won two Brandon Hall Excellence in Technology awards; a Silver for Best Advance in Gaming or Simulation Technology as well as a Bronze for Best Advance in Mobile Learning Technology.

In the annual National Primary Game Creation Competition (NPGCC) organised by Wellington Primary School 3DHive is one of the platforms used by primary school students in Singapore to create games about financial literacy. In the 2016 edition of NPGCC the team Black Jacks from Ang Mo Kio Primary School best Best Game for 3D Hive Category as well as Overall Champion across all categories.

3DHhive.mobi the mobile version of 3DHive won the Gold award in the 'Digital Content' category at the ASEAN Information and Communication Technologies Awards 2016

4Di 

4Di is an advanced multimedia technology platform meant for use by institutions and enterprises for communication with large groups of people. The platform has been demonstrated at various conferences including EXCELFest, Games Convention Asia 2009 and ICTLT 2008. The platform allows many people to interact with it (and through it with each other) in one location at the same time. 
A new concept was coined to describe 4DI's development, called PM3. It describes the platform experience as polyvalent, multimodal and multimedia.

The 4Di system has a panoramic projection that can be scaled to a very wide view of the virtual world and wrapped around a room, including its floor and roof. Its 3D audio effects allow positional sound to add to the immersion. The first version was built for Canberra Primary School for the purpose of supporting learning through play, one of the core thrusts of the school's FutureSchool@Singapore programme. Dubbed Canberra Live!, the programme lets pupils interact with various immersive learning environments such as 'Historical Singapore', 'Rainforest' and 'Shanghai Expo'.

A "lite" version of the 4Di system exists. More compact, it uses 3 projector screens connected to two PCs pre-loaded with 3DHive.

References 

Video game development companies
Companies of Singapore
Video game companies established in 2005
Video game companies of Singapore